856 Backlunda (prov. designation:  or ) is a dark background asteroid from the inner region of the asteroid belt. It was discovered on 3 April 1916, by Russian astronomer Sergey Belyavsky at the Simeiz Observatory on the Crimean peninsula. It was named after Swedish-Russian astronomer Oskar Backlund (1846–1916).

Orbit and classification 

Backlunda is a non-family asteroid of the main belt's background population when applying the hierarchical clustering method to its proper orbital elements. It orbits the Sun in the inner asteroid belt at a distance of 2.1–2.7 AU once every 3 years and 10 months (1,388 days; semi-major axis of 2.43 AU). Its orbit has an eccentricity of 0.12 and an inclination of 14° with respect to the ecliptic. The body's observation arc begins at Algiers Observatory in North Africa on 28 February 1931, almost 15 years after to its official discovery observation at Simeiz.

Naming 

This minor planet was named after Swedish-born Russian astronomer Oskar Backlund (1846–1916), who is known for studying the orbit of comets, in particular that of Comet Encke. The  was mentioned in The Names of the Minor Planets by Paul Herget in 1955. The astronomer is also honored by the 75-kilometer lunar crater Backlund.

Physical characteristics 

In the Bus–Binzel SMASS classification, Backlunda is a common carbonaceous C-type asteroid. It is also a C-type in the MOVIS catalog of the VISTA Hemisphere Survey conducted with the VISTA telescope at Paranal Observatory in Chile.

Rotation period and poles 

In February 1984, a rotational lightcurve of Backlunda was obtained from photometric observations by Richard Binzel. Lightcurve analysis gave a rotation period of  hours with a brightness variation of  magnitude.

In May 2019, an alternative period determination of  hours with an amplitude of  magnitude was made by Tom Polakis at the Command Module Observatory  in Arizona.

In 2016, a modeled lightcurve gave a concurring sidereal period of  hours using data from a large collaboration of individual observers (such as above). The study also determined two spin axes of (42.0°, 44.0°) and (226.0°, 73.0°) in ecliptic coordinates (λ,β).

Diameter and albedo 

The Collaborative Asteroid Lightcurve Link assumes a standard albedo for carbonaceous asteroids of 0.057 and derives a diameter of 40.51 kilometers based on an absolute magnitude of 10.69. Between 2003 and 2009, several asteroid occultations of Backlunda were observed. These timed observations are taken when the asteroid passes in front of a distant star.

References

External links 
 Lightcurve Database Query (LCDB), at www.minorplanet.info
 Dictionary of Minor Planet Names, Google books
 Asteroids and comets rotation curves, CdR – Geneva Observatory, Raoul Behrend
 Discovery Circumstances: Numbered Minor Planets (1)-(5000) – Minor Planet Center
 
 

000856
Discoveries by Sergei Belyavsky
Named minor planets
000856
19160403